Acacia praetermissa  is a species of wattle native to a small area in the Northern Territory of Australia. It was listed as vulnerable in 2006 according to the Environment Protection and Biodiversity Conservation Act 1999.

Description
It has blotchy blue-grey coloured bark with a smooth texture and purple-brown terete branchlets that are often covered in a fine white powdery coating. Like most species of Acacia it has phyllodes rather than true leaves. The spreading phyllodes have a narrowly oblanceolate to elliptic shape and are slightly sickle shaped. Following flowering it produces glabrous woody seed pods that have a more or less linear to narrowly oblanceolate shape.

Distribution
The shrub has a limited distribution in the Pine Creek to Emerald Springs are in the top end of the Northern Territory where it is often situated on hillsides in lateritic or sandy silt soils as a part of Eucalyptus woodland communities.

See also
 List of Acacia species

References

praetermissa
Flora of the Northern Territory
Taxa named by Mary Tindale
Plants described in 1980